During the 2008–09 Portuguese football season, FC Porto competed in the Primeira Liga.

First-team squad
Squad at end of season

Left club during season

References

Notes

FC Porto
FC Porto seasons
Portuguese football championship-winning seasons